Halvarsson is a Swedish surname. Notable people with the surname include:

 Jan Halvarsson (1942–2020), Swedish cross-country skier
 Joakim Halvarsson (born 1972), Swedish ski mountaineer

Swedish-language surnames